Club Athletico Paulistano, abbreviated as C.A. Paulistano or C.A.P., is the senior men's basketball section of the Brazilian multi-sports club Club Athletico Paulistano (C.A.P.), which is based in São Paulo, Brazil. The team competes in the top-tier level Brazilian league, the Novo Basquete Brasil (NBB). For sponsorship reasons, the club is also currently known as Paulistano/Corpore, or Paulistano Corpore.

History
Paulistano was the first team of  point guard Marcelinho Huertas, long-time player and captain of the senior Brazilian national basketball team. In the NBB 2009–10 season, the club's managers signed center Rafael "Bàbby" Araújo, who had just a been Brazilian national league champion with C.R. Flamengo, a season before. But the team did not have a good season, and finished the season in eleventh place in the Brazilian NBB League. The following NBB 2010–11 season was even worse than the previous one, and Paulistano finished the season in twelfth place in the NBB.

In the NBB 2011–12 season, under the guidance of head coach Gustavo de Conti, and led on the court by the young players Elinho Neto and Betinho Duarte, Paulistano had the best NBB season in the club's history, as they finished in seventh place in the regular season standings. In the NBB playoffs, the experienced team of Franca defeated the young team from São Paulo. In the following NBB 2012–13 season, Paulistano lost Betinho Duarte to Minas, and Guillermo Araújo to its greatest rival, E.C. Pinheiros.

Honors and titles

National
 Brazilian Championship
 Champions (1): 2018 
 Runners-up (2): 2014, 2017

 Brazilian Super Cup
 Runners-up (1): 2003

Regional
 São Paulo State Championship
 Champions (1): 2017
 Runners-up (4): 2005, 2009, 2013 2018

Inter-regional
 Copa Brasil Sul
 Champions (1): 2003

Players

Current roster

Notable players
To appear in this section a player must have either:
- Set a club record or won an individual award as a professional player.
- Played at least one official international match for his senior national team at any time.

Head coaches
 José Neto
 Gustavo Conti

References

External links
Official website 
LatinBasket.com Team Page

Basketball teams established in 1922
Basketball teams in São Paulo
Basketball teams in Brazil
Novo Basquete Brasil